Gatha Navnathanchi is a Marathi-language mythological television series which is airing on Sony Marathi. The show premiered on 21 June 2021. Jayesh Shewalkar, Shantanu Gangane, Aniruddha Joshi and Nakul Ghanekar are playing the lead roles.

Plot 
The serial is about Navnath and the story of nine saints (Navnath) who takes birth on earth for a mission to save humanity and bring order to Earth. They shows each and every mythological events of every navnath.

Cast 
 Jayesh Shewalkar as Macchindranath
 Aniruddha Joshi
 Shantanu Gangane
 Nakul Ghanekar as Gorakshnath
 Prathamesh Viveki as Chouranginath
 Surabhi Hande as Saptashrungi Devi
 Mrudula Kulkarni
 Amrut Gaikwad
 Pratiksha Jadhav as Mainavati

References

External links 
 
 Gatha Navnathanchi at SonyLIV

Sony Marathi original programming
Marathi-language television shows
2021 Indian television series debuts